The 1997 Big East Conference baseball tournament was held at Senator Thomas J. Dodd Memorial Stadium in Norwich, Connecticut. This was the thirteenth annual Big East Conference baseball tournament. The  won their fifth tournament championship and claimed the Big East Conference's automatic bid to the 1997 NCAA Division I baseball tournament.

Format and seeding 
The Big East baseball tournament was a 6 team double elimination tournament in 1997. The top six regular season finishers were seeded one through six based on conference winning percentage only, regardless of division.

Bracket 

* - Indicates game required 11 innings.

Jack Kaiser Award 
Mike Dzurilla was the winner of the 1997 Jack Kaiser Award. Dzurilla was a third baseman for St. John's.

References 

Tournament
Big East Conference Baseball Tournament
Big East Conference baseball tournament
Big East Conference baseball tournament
College baseball tournaments in Connecticut
Norwich, Connecticut